Southern Hospitality is the seventh album from Christian rock group Disciple, released October 21, 2008. The album debuted at #98 on the Billboard 200. 'Right There," "3-2-1," "Romance Me," "Lay My Burdens," and "Whatever Reason" were all released as radio singles.  This would be the last album to feature longtime members Brad Noah, Joey Fife, and Tim Barrett.

Track listing

Awards
The album was nominated for a Dove Award for Rock Album of the Year at the 40th GMA Dove Awards.

References

2008 albums
Disciple (band) albums
INO Records albums
Albums produced by Travis Wyrick